Today 84% of the population in Georgia practices Orthodox Christianity, primarily the Georgian Orthodox Church. Of these, around 2% follow the Russian Orthodox Church, around 5.9% (almost all of whom are ethnic Armenians) follow the Armenian Apostolic Church and 0.8% are  Catholics and are mainly found in the south of Georgia but with a small number in its capital, Tbilisi.

A Pew Center study about religion and education around the world in 2016, found that between the various Christian communities, Georgia ranks as the third highest nation in terms of Christians who obtain a university degree in institutions of higher education (57%).

History

According to Orthodox tradition, Christianity was first preached in Georgia by the Apostles Simon and Andrew in the 1st century. It became the state religion of Kartli (Iberia) in 319.  The conversion of Kartli to Christianity  is credited to a Greek woman, St. Nino of Cappadocia. The Georgian Orthodox Church, originally part of the Church of Antioch, gained its autocephaly and developed its doctrinal specificity progressively between the 5th and 10th centuries. The Bible was also translated into Georgian in the 5th century, as the Georgian alphabet was developed for that purpose. As was true elsewhere, the Christian church in Georgia was crucial to the development of a written language, and most of the earliest written works were religious texts. Pre-Christian Georgia was religiously diverse, the religions practiced in ancient Georgia include local pagan beliefs, various Hellenistic cults (mainly in Colchis), Mithraism and Zoroastrianism. The adoption of Christianity was to place Georgia permanently on the front line of conflict between the Islamic and Christian worlds. Georgians remained mostly Christian despite repeated invasions by Muslim powers, and long episodes of foreign domination. After Georgia was annexed by the Russian Empire, the Russian Orthodox Church took over the Georgian church in 1811.

The Georgian church regained its autocephaly only when Russian rule ended in 1917. The Soviet regime, which ruled Georgia from 1921, did not consider revitalization of the Georgian church an important goal, however. Soviet rule brought severe purges of the Georgian church hierarchy and frequent repression of Orthodox worship. As elsewhere in the Soviet Union, many churches were destroyed or converted into secular buildings. The history of repression encouraged the incorporation of religious identity into the strong nationalist movement and the quest of Georgians for religious expression outside the official government-controlled church. In the late 1960s and the early 1970s, opposition leaders, especially Zviad Gamsakhurdia, criticized corruption in the church hierarchy. After Ilia II became the patriarch (catholicos) of the Georgian Orthodox Church in the late 1970s, Georgian Orthodoxy experienced a revival. In 1988, Moscow permitted the patriarch to begin consecrating and reopening closed churches, and a large-scale restoration process began. The Georgian Orthodox Church has regained much power and full independence from the state since the restoration of Georgia's independence in 1991.

Georgian Orthodox and Apostolic Church

The Georgian Orthodox Church (full title Georgian Apostolic Autocephalous Orthodox Church, or in the Georgian language, საქართველოს სამოციქულო მართლმადიდებელი ავტოკეფალური ეკლესია Sakartvelos Samocikulo Martlmadidebeli Avt'ok'epaluri Ek'lesia) is one of the world's oldest Christian Churches, and tradition traces its origins to the mission of Apostle Andrew in the 1st century. It is an autocephalous (self-headed) part of the Eastern Orthodox Church.  Georgian Orthodoxy has been a state religion in parts of Georgia since the 4th century, and is the majority religion in that country.

The Constitution of Georgia recognizes the special role of the Georgian Orthodox Church in the country's history but also stipulates the independence of the church from the state. The relations between the State and the Church are regulated by the Constitutional Agreement of 2002.

Oriental Orthodoxy

Adherents of Oriental Orthodox Christianity in Georgia are mainly ethnic Armenians. Communities of Armenian Apostolic Church in Georgia are under the ecclesiastical jurisdiction of the Mother See of Holy Etchmiadzin, and its eparchy (diocese), centered in the Saint George's Church, Tbilisi. The head of the Armenian Apostolic Diocese in Georgia is bishop Vazgen Mirzakhanyan.

Catholicism

The Georgian Catholic Church (or Catholic Church in Georgia) has always, since the East-West Schism, been composed mainly of Latin Rite Catholics. Since the 18th century, there has also been a significant number of Armenian Rite Catholics.  Georgian Byzantine-Rite Catholics have always been few, and do not constitute an autonomous ("sui iuris") Church, since canon 27 of the Code of Canons of the Eastern Churches defines these Churches as under a hierarchy of their own and recognized as autonomous by the supreme authority of the Church.

A small number, estimated at 500 worldwide, of Byzantine or "Greek" Rite Georgian Catholics do exist. However, "no organized Georgian Greek Catholic Church ever existed", though, outside of Georgia, "a small Georgian Byzantine Catholic parish has long existed in Istanbul. Currently it is without a priest. Twin male and female religious orders 'of the Immaculate Conception' were founded there in 1861, but have since died out." This was never established as a recognized particular Church of any level (exarchate, ordinariate etc.), within the communion of Catholic Churches, and accordingly has never appeared in the list of Eastern Catholic Churches published in the Annuario Pontificio.

Protestantism
The earliest traceable contact between Georgia and Protestantism took place in the mid-16th century. Shortly after 1574, a copy of the Augsburg Confession was translated into Georgian and sent to Georgia. In 1781, Theodor Grabsch, a German missionary of the Moravian Brethren, met with King Heraclius II of Georgia, who invited the Moravians to settle in Georgia. This planned Protestant settlement never took place, because of the Treaty of Georgievsk. Some German Radical Pietism did settle in Georgia under Russian rule, looking for religious freedom. These were mostly from Swabia and followed the Chiliastic theology of Heinrich Stilling. Many of these Pietist groups were brought into the mainstream Lutheranism by the 1860s. Little effort was made by these Protestants to proselytize native Georgians, since it was believed it would jeopardize their freedoms. In the 1860s, the first Baptist church was established in Tbilisi by Martin Klaweit and Nikita Voronin. It converted many Molokans.

See also
 Freedom of religion in Georgia (country)

References

Bibliography
 
 

 
Religion in Georgia (country)